Kovan is a neighbourhood located within the town of Hougang, in the North-East Region of Singapore. The neighbourhood today largely consists of private housing properties, where majority of the residents live in terrace homes, semi-detached houses and bungalows.

Geography
As part of Hougang, Kovan is situated east of Serangoon, in the North-East Region of Singapore. As a relatively small suburb, Kovan's boundaries are relatively unclear. The Urban Redevelopment Authority defines its boundaries as Hougang Avenue 2 to the north, Yio Chu Kang Road to the west, southwest and south and Upper Serangoon Road to the east. However in reality, numerous Kovan amenities are at the other side of Upper Serangoon Road outside the above boundary. These include: Kovan Heartland Mall, Kovan City, Kovan Hub, Kovan Market and Food Centre, Kovan Sports Centre, Paya Lebar Kovan Community Club. As with the North East MRT Line opening back in 2003, using Kovan as its station name, the surrounding  areas began to adopt and incorporate its name into its amenities.

Etymology
Kovan was traditionally an area associated with the Teochew community. Kovan's Teochew name is  "La gou jio", which means six miles from the old General Post Office at Fullerton Building. A number of road names at Kovan commemorate the more prominent members of this community.

Road name origins
 Aroozoo Avenue and Simon Road were named after Dr Simon Aroozoo (1850-1931), also known as Dr Max Simon. He is a prominent Eurasian of Portuguese descent. A philanthropist well-known for his charitable contributions to education and healthcare causes in Singapore. He helped to manage Gan Eng Seng estate at Upper Serangoon after the latter’s death in 1899. 
 Dix Road was probably named after R A Dix, Manager of colonial British company "Singapore United Rubber Plantation Limited" which owned the land in the area.
 Ee Teow Leng Road is named after a Teochew Merchant.
 Florence Road / Close was named after Lim Ah Pin's wife Florence Yeo (1887–1962). The couple built bungalows in the area. 
 Glasgow Road named after Glasgow, the biggest city of Scotland.
 Hendry Close was probably named after P H Hendry (1887–1961). A Sinhalese jeweler.
 Lim Ah Pin Road takes its name from Lim Ah Pin (林亚柄) (1890–1943), “bee hoon” king, a rice vermicelli manufacturer.
 Lorong Ah Soo was named after Ng Ah Soo (-1929), also known as Ng Thye Hiong. He owned a large coconut plantation at 7 miles Serangoon Road.
 Parry Avenue / Road was probably named after one of "Singapore United Rubber Plantation Limited" Director, E H Parry.
 Poh Huat Road was probably named after a land owner Ong Poh Huat.
 Richard Avenue / Place were probably named after Peter Richards (-1936). He was the chief engineer of the official Yacht of the  Singapore Governor. who owned a large plot of land in the area.
 Robey Crescent was named after Gordon Robey who developed that area.
 Rosyth Road named after Rosyth, a town on the Firth of Forth in Fife, Scotland. Rosyth Avenue was named in 1953.
 Sirat Place / Road was named after Sirat, a Malay businessman who was supplying satay and Indonesian delicacies.
 Surin Avenue was named after the Eurasian Surin family who owned silent movie theaters.

Demographics
In 2019, there are 24,850 people living in Kovan. 12,020 (48.37%) male and 12,830 (51.63%) female.

3,970 (5.98%) people live in HDB flats, 8,730 (35.13%) live in condominium/other apartments, 11,840 (47,65%)live in landed properties and 310 (1.25%) live in other accommodation.

Transportation
The main road connecting Kovan to the other parts of Singapore is Upper Serangoon Road. Both Kovan MRT station and Heartland Mall are situated along this major road. Nearby is the Kallang-Paya Lebar Expressway, which provides a direct route to the city area.

Public transport in Kovan includes the North East line served by Kovan MRT station, which is just in front of Heartland Mall. Kovan formerly had a bus interchange, which is now renamed Kovan Hub. However, many buses still pass through Kovan, as they ply through the main Upper Serangoon Road. The pair of bus stops connected to Kovan MRT station is a major one, and a relatively high number of buses passing through heads towards Hougang, Serangoon or to the city.

Former Bus Interchange

Hougang South Bus Interchange was closed since 15 February 2004 with the surrounding neighbourhoods expansion in Hougang over the years. Thus with the move of main town centre, its purpose for another interchange in the same town slowly diminished. The facility was then acquired and repurposed for other developments.

It was situated at Hougang Street 21 next to the Kovan food centre/Wet Market, near Heartland Mall. All bus services were relocated to Hougang Central Bus Interchange, except 62 (of which it was modified as Punggol - Geylang Lor 1 service, and feeder services were merged into 101, 112 and 113 respectively. The old bus interchange is now a community space with a public carpark residing at the former end-on berths of the northern end. Only one former sawtooth berth is still existent on the southern end, and it serves the express coach buses that crosses the borders and 4 public bus services currently serve the bus stop (Kovan Hub):

 Hougang Ave 3 (Loop) - 115
 Hougang Central - 112 & 113
 Punggol - 119

Housing
The main type of housing in Kovan are landed homes. The condominiums Kovan Melody, and Kovan Residences are on the main road, directly opposite Kovan MRT station. Recently completed is Stars of Kovan, which is at the corner of Upper Serangoon Road and Tampines Road.

A new HDB Built-To-Order (BTO), Kovan Well-Spring with a new Community Club will be the latest addition to Kovan.

Amenities
The main amenity in Kovan is Heartland Mall. Heartland Mall is well-served by a number of well-known outlets and shops, such as Cold Storage, Popular Book Shop, Challenger, Watsons, Prima Deli, Toast Box, Ya Kun Kaya Toast, Mos Burger, Burger King, Saizeriya and Buddy Hoagies. Kovan Sports Centre is just across the road from Heartland Mall, which have eight sheltered indoor futsal courts. A bowling alley, is also near Heartland Mall.
Located beside Heartland Mall, the Kovan 209 Market & Food Court offers a variety of cooked food and drinks has been serving the residents in the area for years and is a very popular dining spot in the North East region. Within the vicinity are plenty of neighbourhood shops that sells fruits, plants and many daily use items.

There is also a neighbourhood park south of Heartland Mall which is opposite Yuying Secondary School. There are also two community clubs in Kovan, the Aljunied Community Club (Blk 110) and the Paya Lebar Kovan Community Club which is opposite Kovan Hub. A number of pubs and cafes like Grapevine Cafe Bar and Restaurant, O Bar, Greenland Vegetarian Restaurant are found in the area.

Places of worship

Buddhist Temple
 Buddhist Union Dharma Centre
 Lam Hai Poh Toh San (南海普陀山)
 Lin Chee Cheng Sia Temple (萬佛堂蓮池精舍), their late Abbess Venerable Jing Run founded Man Fut Tong Nursing Home

Chinese Temples
 Hougang Tou Mu Kung Temple (后港斗母宫)
 Long Xu Yan Temple (龍鬚巖), inside Nanyang Neo Clan Association (南洋梁氏公會)
 Phoh Kiu Siang Tng (普救善堂), Teochew Charitable Hall Temple
 Sai Ho Piat Su Temple (西河别墅), Lim Clan Temple dedicated to Goddess Mazu
 Shi Niu Dong Temple (石牛洞), founded in 1988 at Chuan Hoe Avenue and moved to Ubi Road 4

Churches
 Immaculate Heart of Mary Church
 Kim Tian Christian Church
 Lim Ah Pin Church of Christ
 Living Sanctuary Brethren Church
 Russian Orthodox Church 
 St. Paul's Church
 Tai Seng Christian Church
 Yio Chu Kang Chapel

Mosque
 Masjid Haji Yusoff

Cemetery
 Japanese Cemetery Park

Education
There is only one primary (Xinghua) and secondary school (Yuying) in Kovan. These two schools are part of the 19 educational institutions in Hougang.

There used to be several more schools located deep inside the housing estate and the surrounding area. These include Rosyth School, Serangoon Secondary School, Monfort Secondary School, XinMing Secondary School. These schools have moved to other areas such as Serangoon North and Hougang. The last school to stop operations, Parry Primary School, closed down in late 2006.

Politics
Part of Kovan falls under Aljunied GRC, and is located within the constituency's Paya Lebar division. Residents within the neighbourhood is currently represented by Sylvia Lim, who is part of the Workers' Party (Singapore).

Gallery

See also 
 Hougang
 Kovan MRT station

References

Places in Singapore
North-East Region, Singapore
Hougang